Karragarra Island is one of the inhabited Southern Moreton Bay Islands, near Brisbane, in Queensland, Australia. It is also a town and locality in the City of Redland, Queensland, Australia.

Geography 
Krummel Passage is a channel to the south of the island separating it from Russell Island.

There is no bridge to the island. Most transport is by boat with vehicular and passenger ferry services available. There is also a helipad on the foreshore park opposite 96 The Esplanade which can be used for medical emergencies.

History 
The median age of the Karragarra Island population was 61 years, 24 years above the national median of 37.  65.2% of people living in Karragarra Island were born in Australia. The other top responses for country of birth were England 7.5%, New Zealand 4.3%, Scotland 3.1%, Zimbabwe 3.1%, Croatia 2.5%.  87.7% of people spoke only English at home; the next most common languages were 1.8% Croatian, 1.8% Finnish, 1.8% Arabic.

In the  the locality of Karragarra Island had a population of 204 people.

Education
There are no schools on the island. The nearest primary schools are Macleay Island State School on Macleay Island to the east and Russell Island State School on Russell Island to the south-west. The nearest secondary school is Victoria Point State High School at Victoria Point on the mainland. These schools can be accessed by ferry.

Amenities
The Karragarra Island Rural Fire Brigade Station is at 11A Noyes Parade.

There is a boat ramp and pontoon  opposite the Karragarra Island Foreshore Park at 176-180 The Esplanade on the north-west side of the island. It is managed by the Redland City Council. It is the ferry terminal for ferries between the islands (free service) and to the mainland (paid service).

References

Islands of Moreton Bay
Suburbs of Redland City
Localities in Queensland
Towns in Queensland